Liu Wenjie (born 27 September 2001) is a Chinese footballer currently playing as a forward for Jiangxi Beidamen.

Career statistics

Club
.

Notes

References

2001 births
Living people
Chinese footballers
Association football forwards
China League One players
Guangzhou City F.C. players
Jiangxi Beidamen F.C. players